Krupina is a town in southern central Slovakia. It is part of the Banská Bystrica Region and has approximately 8,000 inhabitants.

Etymology
The name is probably derived from Slavic root krup. Proto-Slavic: krǫpъ, krǫpъjь – solid, strong. The root is present also in krupa (krǫpa) – a smaller fortress, a fortified settlement, -ina is a frequent suffix.  Another theory is based on the meaning "coarse". The settlement could be named after the nearby river, as the river had a rough and rocky bottom.

History
The territory of modern-day Krupina was inhabited since the Neolithic, based on archaeological findings from the Bronze Age. The first written reference to the towns river dates back to 1135. The first people to inhabit it were the Slavs. Between the 12th and 13th century the Germans arrived in Krupina, later between the 17th and 18th centuries the Magyars (Hungarians). Along with Trnava, Krupina is the oldest town in Slovakia, having received town privileges in 1238. The settlement lay on a route known as the "via magna", connecting the Baltic Sea with the Adriatic. After the Mongol invasion of 1241/1242, when the town was sacked, it was rebuilt and received its town privileges again in 1244 and became a "free royal town".

The "Krupina law", based on the Magdeburg rights, was the basis for many towns in central and northern Slovakia. The deposits of gold and silver ran out in the 14th century and thereafter the town's economy was based on handicraft and agriculture. In the first half of the 15th century the town was threatened by the remains of the Hussites led by John Giskra. As the Turks advanced into the Kingdom of Hungary, the town built its town walls and sentry tower, and the Turks couldn't capture the town until 1682. It was also besieged in 1582, 1647 and 1678 and was ravaged in 1626 by Turks. Turks held it until 1686. Later, Krupina was involved in the Kuruc uprisings at the beginning of the 18th century, burnt down in 1708 and suffered from a plague in 1710. The first schools were opened in the 18th century. After the break-up of Austria-Hungary in 1918, the town became part of Czechoslovakia, was briefly occupied by the Slovak Soviet Republic in 1919, came back quickly into Czechoslovakia, and since 1993 has been a part of Slovakia.

Literature:

 Sliačan, J.: Krupina. Krupina, 1944. 
 Zrebený, A.: Z feudálnych dejín Krupiny. Martin, 1974. 
 Lukáč, M. et al.: Krupina - monografia mesta. Banská Bystrica, 2006 (with the English summary).

Geography
It lies on the Krupina Plain under the Štiavnica Mountains, halfway between Zvolen and Šahy. North of the town the Mäsiarsky bok national nature reserve with cliffs and stone seas is located.

Demographics
According to the 2014 census, the town had 8,010 inhabitants. In 2001 97.63% of the inhabitants were Slovaks, 1.14% Roma, 0.38% Czechs and 0.30% Hungarians. The religious make-up was 70.32% Roman Catholics, 17.91% Lutherans and 9.27% people with no religious affiliation.

Twin towns — sister cities

Krupina is twinned with:
 Anykščiai, Lithuania
 Krapinske Toplice, Croatia
 Nepomuk, Czech Republic

People
 Andrej Sládkovič, poet
 Jozef Fojtik, folk artist
 Elena Maróthy-Šoltésová, writer and editor

References
''Part of the information is based on the corresponding article on the German Wikipedia

External links
 
 
 Town newspaper website (Krupinské noviny) 

Magdeburg rights
Cities and towns in Slovakia